Kang Ding (康丁) or Geng Ding (庚丁) was a king of the Shang dynasty of China  His given name is Xiao (嚣).  He got his throne in the year of Jiawu (甲午) and his capital was at Yin (殷).

Regin disputes
Different sources suggest different lengths of reign for the king.Bamboo Annals suggest a 8 year reign.ZizhiTongjianwaiji(A suppplement to the Zizhi Tongjian) and Tongzhi suggest a 6 year reign.The DiwangbenJi(帝王本紀) quoted in Tongzhi suggests a 11 year reign.

References

Shang dynasty kings
12th-century BC Chinese monarchs